Ödsmåls IK is a Swedish football club located in Ödsmål. Their March 2020 calendar has been announced on their website.

External links
 Official website

Football clubs in Västra Götaland County
1939 establishments in Sweden
Association football clubs established in 1939